Giorgio Almirante (27 June 1914 – 22 May 1988) was an Italian politician who founded the neo-fascist Italian Social Movement, which he led until his retirement in 1987.

Early life 
Almirante was born at Salsomaggiore Terme, in Emilia Romagna, but his parents were Molisian with noble ancestry. His aunt was actress Italia Almirante Manzini. He spent his childhood following his parents, who worked in the theatre, in Turin and Rome. He graduated in Literature in 1937.

Pre-war Fascism and role during World War II
Almirante trained as a schoolteacher, but went to work writing for the Rome-based fascist paper Il Tevere. He was influenced by the journalist Telesio Interlandi, who was his ideological mentor. A journalist by profession, Almirante wrote extensively for Interlandi's journal La Difesa della Razza (The defence of race). Almirante also helped to organise the Italian Social Republic (RSI) in which he was appointed Chief of Cabinet of the Minister of Culture in 1944.

Italian Social Movement

Leadership 
Following the defeat of fascism Almirante was indicted on charges that he ordered the shooting of partisans in 1944, although a general amnesty saw this lifted. He fled Italy after the war but returned in 1946 to set up his own small fascist group. It was quickly absorbed into the Italian Social Movement (MSI), which was set up the same year. Almirante was chosen as leader of the new party in part because of his low profile, as the higher-ranking members of the fascist regime involved in the MSI opted instead to take on behind the scenes roles. Representing a radical faction within the party, Almirante's group lost ground as more moderate elements gained influence in the party; this tendency soon gained the upper hand, forcing Almirante to give way to Augusto De Marsanich as leader in 1950. He had intimated his support for the Europe a nation ideas prevalent at the time but failed to convince the party to take a position against De Marsanich's pro-NATO policy.

Opposition 
During the mid-1950s Almirante, disquieted by the drift towards conservatism under De Marsanich and his successor Arturo Michelini, resigned his position on the National Council to become a critic of the leadership. He emphasised the proletarian origins of fascism against the new conservatism and argued for 'quality' rather than 'quantity' in government, endorsing expert-driven elites instead of liberal democracy. However, he stopped short of the route taken by the other leading dissident Pino Rauti by remaining within the party. Like Rauti, however, he became increasingly influenced in his thought by Julius Evola, even hailing the philosopher as "our Marcuse – only better".

In his role as leader of the internal opposition Almirante was not averse to employing the tactics of the Blackshirts, and indeed in 1968 he was one of three leaders of a 'punitive expedition' against student radicals at the Fine Arts Department at the University of Rome. However, Almirante and some 200 followers were routed and in the end were protected by the police.

Return to the leadership 

Almirante regained the leadership of the party in 1969 following the death of Michelini. By now his own opinions had shifted somewhat towards a more moderate position as he soon declared his own support for democracy. On this basis he aimed to attract more conservative elements to the MSI, while simultaneously passing reforms that strengthened the power of the party secretary in order to pre-empt opposition from the radical tendency with which he had been associated. He also sought to 'historicise' fascism and dropped the more overt references to the ideology from MSI propaganda and rhetoric, notably shelving the black shirt and the Roman salute.

His new policy, known as the strategia del doppio binario (double track strategy), was not aimed at making the MSI more palatable to the Christian Democrats, as had been the plan of his predecessor, but rather to move the MSI into that party's ideological space and so challenge them directly for the leadership of the right. Almirante felt that by placing anti-communism at the heart of the MSI's appeal the party could attract both its existing followers and more moderate conservatives and could in time rival Christian Democrats as the main party of the right. As part of this policy he brought in a number of disparate rightist groups, merging the MSI with the Italian Democratic Party of Monarchist Unity, readmitting the hard-line splinter group Ordine Nuovo (New Order), and adding establishment figures such as Admiral Gino Birindelli and General Giovanni de Lorenzo as members. However, the policy floundered as the MSI made few inroads into Christian Democrat support and instead pushed the mainstream right towards an accommodation with the Italian Communist Party. As a consequence some of the moderate faction split off to form the National Democracy in 1977.

Despite the policy's failure to deliver at the ballot box, under Almirante's leadership the MSI did emerge to an extent from the political ghetto, a shift demonstrated in 1984 when Almirante was allowed to enter the headquarters of the Communist Party in order to pay respects to their dead leader Enrico Berlinguer, a gesture that had been unimaginable for an MSI leader. However, his newly moderate approach brought him into conflict with Rauti and clashes between the two became a feature of the annual party conference.

Almirante also served the MSI in parliament although he was stripped of parliamentary immunity three times: in 1979, he was charged with trying to revive the Fascist Party; and in 1981 and also in 1984, he was charged with aiding and abetting Carlo Cicuttini, who had fled Italy after a 1972 Peteano car bomb that killed three policemen. However, Almirante received amnesty under a 1987 law.

Retirement 
Dogged by poor health, Almirante stepped down as leader at the 1987 National Congress and saw the leadership pass to his protégé Gianfranco Fini. Fini had been close to Almirante since 1977 when the MSI leader had Fini appointed chief of the MSI youth movement even though he had only finished seventh in the members vote. Fini largely followed in Almirante's footsteps of attempting to shift Italy from a parliamentary to a fully presidential system.

Almirante died in Rome on 22 May 1988, on the same weekend as his former colleagues and fellow Italian Fascist leaders Dino Grandi and Pino Romualdi. Grandi and Romualdi died on 21 May 1988, and Almirante died the following day.

Electoral history

References

External links 

 Biography and photo  

1914 births
1988 deaths
Anti-Masonry
Antisemitism in Italy
People from Salsomaggiore Terme
Italian fascists
Italian male journalists
People of the Italian Social Republic
Italian Social Movement politicians
Italian anti-communists
MEPs for Italy 1979–1984
20th-century Italian journalists
20th-century Italian male writers